The following is a list of events affecting Philippine television in 1999. Events listed include television show debuts, finales, cancellations, and channel launches, closures and rebrandings, as well as information about controversies and carriage disputes.

Events 
 December 31 - Philippine television marks the turning of the century in a big way as it heralds the dawn of the New Millennium.
 PTV Network hosts the telecasts of the national millennium festivities held in the Rizal Park in Manila led by President Joseph Estrada.
 GMA Network airs nationwide the national edition of the successful 2000 Today broadcast, with celebrations centering at the Makati Central Business District. At around 11:50pm, Regine Velasquez sang the Philippine Millennium theme song, "Written in the Sand", live at the top of The Peninsula Manila.
 ABS-CBN hosts its own celebration coverage, focused not just on concerts of its big network talents in three venues: the Expo Pilipino Amphitheater in the Clark Freeport and Special Economic Zone in Pampanga, and within Metro Manila, the Quezon Memorial Circle (Quezon City), and The Fort in Bonifacio Global City (Taguig), but also on news reports of the celebrations from all over the country and the world as the new year and new century arrives. Within minutes to midnight, the network airs a special identity card marking the change to the new century with the introduction of its current logo, set to Ryan Cayabyab's music which the network would later adopt as the startup and closedown tune till the mid-2000s. The marathon telecast was originally the national edition of Millennium Live, which was cancelled days before due to lack of funding from most of the international TV networks that joined the project, but was finally pushed through as a series of international broadcasts by some of the partner channels.

Premieres

Unknown
 ABS-CBN & Unilever: Pamilyong Papremyo sa Pamilya on ABS-CBN 2
 MIB: Mga Imbestigador ng Bayan on ABS-CBN 2
 Pipol on ABS-CBN 2
 Sky Ranger Gavan on ABC 5
 Fora Medica on PTV 4
 How 'Bout My Place on RPN 9
 Tipong Pinoy on RPN 9
 Felicity on RPN 9
 Lingkod Bayan ni Tony Falcon on IBC 13
 Back to Iskul Bukol on IBC 13
 Friends Again on IBC 13
 Travel Time on ANC
 News Bites on Studio 23
 PBA Classics on UltraVision 25
 Pilot Guides on UltraVision 25
 The Message on UltraVision 25
 Thunderstone on Ultravision 25
 GMA Love Stories on GMA 7
 Kasangga on GMA 7
 Comedy Central Market on GMA 7
 Ooops! on GMA 7
 Koko Kwik Kwak on GMA 7
 INC on GMA: Gabay sa Mabuting Asal on GMA 7
 Teletubbies on GMA 7
 Campus Video on GMA 7
 One Cubed on GMA 7
 TV Shopper on GMA 7
 Inhumanoids on ABC 5
 Epol/Apple on ABS-CBN 2
 Watch U Want on Channel V Philippines
 New Idea TV Shopping on RJTV 29 & CTV 31
 Sine VTV on IBC 13

Programs transferring networks

Finales
 January 1: GoBingo (GMA 7)
 January 11: Firing Line (GMA 7)
 January 29: Mukha ng Buhay (PTV 4)
 February 6:
 Gimik (ABS-CBN 2)
 Takot Ka Ba Sa Dilim? (IBC 13)
 February 12:
 Growing Up (GMA 7)
 Tierra Sangre (PTV 4)
 February 26:
 Ms. D! (GMA 7)
 Brunch with Bing & Michelle (GMA 7)
 Halik sa Apoy (GMA 7)
 February 27: Sabado Live! (ABS-CBN 2)
 March 6: Dear Heart on IBC 13
 March 7: Kapag May Katwiran, Ipaglaban Mo! (ABS-CBN 2)
 March 13: Tropang Trumpo (ABC 5)
 March 22: Hyper Speed GranDoll (GMA 7)
 March 31: Citynet Television News (Citynet 27)
 April 9: Mula sa Puso (ABS-CBN 2)
 May 14: Del Tierro (GMA 7)
 June 4: Alondra (ABS-CBN 2)
 June 6: Showbiz Lingo Plus (ABS-CBN 2)
 June 7: Nagmamahal Pa Rin Sa Iyo (ABS-CBN 2)
 July 23: 
 Chopsuey Espesyal (IBC 13)
 Esperanza (ABS-CBN 2) 
 August 13: The World Tonight (ABS-CBN 2)
 August 20: 
 GMA Network News (GMA 7)
 Saksi: GMA Headline Balita (GMA 7)
 August 28: Super Laff-In (ABS-CBN 2)
 September 1: Mikee Forever (GMA 7)
 September 6: Sa Sandaling Kailangan Mo Ako (ABS-CBN 2)
 October 29: Di Ba't Ikaw (GMA 7)
 November 27: T.G.I.S. (GMA 7)
 December 3: Mornings @ GMA (GMA 7)
 December 12: PBA on Vintage Sports (IBC 13)
 December 25: Saturday Night Blockbusters (ABC 5)
 December 27: Entertainment Today (ABC 5)

Unknown
 Kassandra on ABS-CBN 2
 Cinderella on ABS-CBN 2
Mobile Suit Gundam Wing on GMA 7
Remi, Nobody's Girl on ABS-CBN 2
Akazukin Chacha on ABS-CBN 2
Blue Blink on ABS-CBN 2
Lost Universe on ABS-CBN 2
Isami on ABS-CBN 2
Kamen Rider Black on IBC 13
 Metalders on IBC 13
 Super Rescue Solbrain on IBC 13
 Gameplan on GMA 7
 Magnegosyo on GMA 7
 Hiwalay Kung Hiwalay Daw on GMA 7
 Midnight Prayer Helps on GMA 7
 Mikee on GMA 7
 Dear Mikee on GMA 7
 TEXT (The Extreme Team) on GMA 7
 Best Frends on GMA 7
 Next on GMA 7
 Special Engagement on GMA 7
 PG (Parents Guide) on GMA 7
 Golympics on GMA 7
 Rainbow Cinema on GMA 7
 Job Network on PTV 4
 Relaks Lang on PTV 4
 Cyber Jam on SBN 21
 Goin' Bayabas on IBC 13
 Blow by Blow on IBC 13
 Mag Smile Club Na! on IBC 13
 Sine VTV on IBC 13
 Hard Hat on ABC 5
 Nagmamahal Pa Rin Sa Iyo on ABS-CBN 2
 ABS-CBN & Unilever: Pamilyong Papremyo sa Pamilya on ABS-CBN 2
 MIB: Mga Imbestigador ng Bayan on ABS-CBN 2
 Kaybol: Ang Bagong TV on ABS-CBN 2
 The Quantum Channel on ABS-CBN 2
 Campus Romance on GMA 7
 Are You Afraid of A Dark on Studio 23
 Hang Time on Studio 23
 The Secret World of Alex Mack on Studio 23
 Saved By The Bell on Studio 23

Births
January 8 – Kelvin Miranda, actor, model and singer
January 10 – Celine Lim, actress
January 25 – Ysabel Ortega, actress
February 8 – Raine Salamante, actress
March 1 - Zach Guerrero
March 7 – Karen Arnaldo, actress and model 
March 8 – Jhellen Yamzon, actress, dancer and TV host
March 10 - Liofer Pinatacan
March 11 - Jordan Cruz, actor and model 
March 19 – Klea Pineda, actress
April 1 – Jairus Aquino, actor
April 5 – Sharlene San Pedro, actress
April 12 – Janina Vela, actress, model and dancer
April 19 – Khaycee Aboloc, actress
April 21 – Loisa Andalio, actress and model
May 1 – Kisses Delavin, actress
May 14 – Francis Magundayao, actor
June 28 – Antoinette Nicole Aquino, actress
August 17 – Robert Villar, Jr., actor
September 10 – Hannah Pangilinan
October 5 – Pauline Mendoza, actress
October 13 – Yong Muhajil
October 29 – Kristine Hammond, actress and volleyball player
October 23 – Joseph Andre Garcia, actor
November 9 – Kim De Leon, actor
November 25 – Heaven Peralejo, actress
November 26 – Gianna Cutler, actress
December 5 – Julia Buencamino, actress (d. 2015)
December 20 – Migo Adecer, actor and singer

Deaths
 June 28 - Eugenio Lopez Jr., ABS-CBN Chairman Emeritus

References

See also
1999 in television

 
Television in the Philippines by year
Philippine television-related lists